Lecithocera cuspidata is a moth in the family Lecithoceridae. It was described by Chun-Sheng Wu and You-Qiao Liu in 1993. It is found in Sichuan, China.

The wingspan is 18–20 mm. The species resembles Lecithocera ianthodes, but the forewings are larger.

References

Moths described in 1993
cuspidata
Moths of Asia